Shigeaki Saegusa (formerly ; Saegusa Shigeaki; born July 8, 1942) is a Japanese composer.

Career 

Saegusa is best known for his opera version Chushingura of the well-known kabuki epic of the Forty-seven Ronin/Chūshingura with a libretto by the novelist Shimada Masahiko.  Written over a period of 10 years, the opera was most recently performed at the New National Theatre, Tokyo in 2002.  His newest opera, Jr. Butterfly is a sequel to Giacomo Puccini's Madama Butterfly.

He has also written the background music for anime, the foremost of which being Mobile Suit Zeta Gundam.  Other anime he has written for are Astro Boy (1980), Mobile Suit Gundam ZZ, Mobile Suit Gundam: Char's Counterattack, Catnapped! The Movie, and Mother: Saigo no Shoujo Eve.

Works

Opera
1997 Chushingura
2004 Jr. Butterfly

Oratorio
1989 Yamato Takeru

Orchestral works
1971 Piano Concerto
1983 The Symphony
1985 Symfonic Suite Z Gundam
1989 Orchestra '89

Chamber/Instrumental works
1963 Bläserquintet (Wind Quintet)
1965 Novelette for string quartet
1977 Memory for narrator, string quartet and tape
1981 Radiation Mass for 4 synthesizers, vocorder and percussion
1983 Sho '83 for sho, percussion and keyboard
1987 Duo '87 for sangen and koto
1988 Cello '88 for cello solo
1988 Percussion '88 for percussion solo
1994 Four Concertos for violin, cello, piano and sangen

Vocal works
1970 Madrigal for 6 sopranos
1998 Requiem for soprano, tenor, mixed chorus and orchestra
2003 Requiem for soprano, tenor, male chorus and orchestra

Film score
1985 Typhoon Club
1988 Mobile Suit Gundam: Char's Counterattack
1993 Moving
1995 Catnapped!

Music for TV programs
1980 Astro Boy
1982 Ninjiman Ippei
1985 Mobile Suit Zeta Gundam
1986 Mobile Suit Gundam ZZ
1991 Taiheiki
1994 Hana no Ran

Recordings
Chushingura was recorded in 1997 and published on compact disc (Sony Classical SK60233).

Honours
Medal with Purple Ribbon (2007)
Order of the Rising Sun, 4th Class, Gold Rays with Rosette (2017)
Person of Cultural Merit (2020)

References

External links
Shigeaki Saegusa official site 

1942 births
20th-century classical composers
20th-century Japanese male musicians
21st-century classical composers
21st-century Japanese musicians
21st-century Japanese male musicians
Anime composers
Concert band composers
Japanese classical composers
Japanese film score composers
Japanese male classical composers
Japanese male film score composers
Japanese opera composers
Living people
Male opera composers
Musicians from Hyōgo Prefecture
Oratorio composers
Persons of Cultural Merit
Recipients of the Medal with Purple Ribbon
Recipients of the Order of the Rising Sun, 4th class